RV (also known as Runaway Vacation) is a 2006 road comedy film directed by Barry Sonnenfeld, produced by Lucy Fisher and Douglas Wick, written by Geoff Rodkey, and starring Robin Williams, Jeff Daniels, Cheryl Hines, Kristin Chenoweth, Joanna "JoJo" Levesque, and Josh Hutcherson. It follows a beverage company executive and his dysfunctional family who rent an RV for a road trip from Los Angeles to the Colorado Rockies, where they ultimately have to contend with a bizarre community of campers. 

The film is produced by Columbia Pictures, Relativity Media, Intermedia and Red Wagon Entertainment. Distributed by Sony Pictures Releasing, it premiered at the Village Theater in Los Angeles on April 23, 2006. The North American theatrical release followed on April 28, 2006. It was negatively received by critics and grossed $87.5 million worldwide against a $50 million budget.

Plot
Bob Munro, a successful company executive at the large soda company Pure Vibe, struggles with the whims of his self-absorbed boss Todd Mallory. His family — his materialistic wife Jamie and their pubescent children, the sharp-tongued Cassie and the self-confident Carl — are also demanding, and he had promised them a vacation in Hawaii. Todd seeks to acquire the Alpine Soda company in Boulder, Colorado and threatens to fire Bob if he does not promote the takeover there, forcing the Munros to cancel their vacation. Bob, concealing the real reason for not going to Hawaii, rents an RV and tells his family they are traveling to the Rockies; Bob plans to make a detour in Colorado to secretly attend the meeting in Boulder.

The trip is marked by numerous mishaps. Bob's inexperience in handling the large vehicle results in him colliding with various obstacles and damaging the parking brake. During a stopover, the family fumigates the RV with stink bombs to drive out three intrusive raccoons. Later, to the amusement of other campers, Bob must fix an unsavory clog in the toilet tank. During the trip, the Munros have several encounters with the Gornickes, a good-natured but exhausting family who live in their own RV.

As they approach Colorado, the Munros begin to reconnect as a family and enjoy the beauty of their surroundings. Nearing Boulder, Bob fakes an upset stomach and sends the rest of the family on a hike before meeting with the Alpine Soda owners. The meeting is promising for Bob and Todd, but on the way back Bob gets stuck in a traffic jam, forcing him to take the RV through a treacherous 4 wheel drive trail. With considerable difficulty and a badly battered vehicle, Bob returns to his unsuspecting family.

Todd calls Bob and demands that he return the next day to repeat the presentation to the entire Alpine Soda staff. However, the RV's parking brake fails again and sends it rolling into a mountain lake. Through a careless remark by Bob, the family surmises his secrecy and reproaches him. Bob justifies himself by fearing for his job and the loss of their high standard of living, and he makes his way to the meeting alone. The Gornickes appear and take the Munros to seek help in recovering the RV. Along the way, the families bond and eventually find Bob, who reconciles with his family and the Gornickes.

Accidentally arriving at the meeting location, Bob is involuntarily forced to step in front of the Alpine Soda workforce and pitch the takeover to them. Following an epiphany, however, he dissuades them and encourages their independence. In retaliation, Todd fires Bob on the spot, but Bob tells him that he quits anyway. The Munros, on their way home in their sodden and battered RV, are stopped by a police officer on behalf of the Alpine Soda owners, who offer Bob a job in overseeing their company's expansion. The RV's parking brake fails once more, flattening both the police car and the company owners' car.

During the credits, the Munros and the Gornickes sing "Route 66" together.

Cast
 Robin Williams as Bob Munro, an executive at Pure Vibe.
 Jeff Daniels as Travis Gornicke, the patriarch of the Gornicke family.
 Cheryl Hines as Jamie Munro, Bob's wife.
 Kristin Chenoweth as Mary Jo Gornicke, Travis's wife.
 Joanna "JoJo" Levesque as Cassie Munro, Bob and Jamie's 15-year-old daughter.
 Erika-Shaye Gair as 5-year-old Cassie Munro
 Josh Hutcherson as Carl Munro, Bob and Jamie's 12-year-old son.
 Catherine Rose Young as baby Carl Munro (uncredited)
 Will Arnett as Todd Mallory, the CEO of Pure Vibe Bob's self-absorbed boss.
 Hunter Parrish as Earl Gornicke, Travis and Mary Jo's teenage son.
 Chloe Sonnenfeld as Moon Gornicke, Travis and Mary Jo's 12-year-old daughter.
 Alex Ferris as Billy Gornicke, Travis and Mary Jo's 9-year-old son.
 Brendan Fletcher as Howie, an incompetent man who helps Bob with his RV's clogged dump system.
 Rob LaBelle a Larry Moiphine, the co-owner of Alpine Soda.
 Brian Markinson as Garry Moiphine, the co-owner of Alpine Soda and Larry's brother
 Tony Hale as Frank, Bob's co-worker at Pure Vibe.
 Brian Howe as Marty, a hitchhiking guitarist.
 Richard Cox as Laird, a Pure Vibe worker that Todd is training to succeed Bob.
 Veronika Sztopa as Gretchen, Cassie's militaristic friend.
 Kirsten Alter as Tammy
 Matthew Gray Gubler as Joseph "Joe Joe", an incompetent man who helps Bob with his RV's clogged dump system.
 Stephen E. Miller as Organ Stew Guy
 Malcolm Scott as Kenny
 Deborah DeMille as an RV Dump Lady
 Chad Krowchuk as a Scruffy Teenager
 Ty Olsson as a Diablo Pass Officer
 Bruce McFee as Sam, a police officer at Independence Pass who is enlisted by the Gornickes to help catch up to the Munros.
 Giacomo Baessato, Justin Chartier, and Andrew Botz as Hip Hop Wannabes who Bob catches picking on Carl.

 Barry Sonnenfeld as Irv, a dodgy RV dealer.
 Diane Michelle as the voice of the RV GPS (uncredited)

Production
The film began principal photography in the Vancouver area and southern Alberta on May 25, 2005 and finished filming the following August.

Soundtrack
The score was written by James Newton Howard and featured several members of the Lyle Lovett Band: Matt Rollings (keyboards), Russ Kunkel (drums), Ray Herndon (guitar), Viktor Krauss (bass), and Buck Reid (pedal steel). Alvin Chea, vocalist from Take 6, provided solo vocals. Additional music was provided by Stuart Michael Thomas and Blake Neely. Several songs were featured prominently in the film including: "GTO", "Route 66", "Cherry Bomb", and "Stand by Your Man".

Release
The film was theatrically released in North America on April 28, 2006 by Columbia Pictures and was released on UMD, DVD and Blu-ray Disc on August 15, 2006 by Sony Pictures Home Entertainment.

The film grossed $71.7 million in America and $15.8 million in other territories for a total gross of $87.5 million, against a production budget of $50 million. In its opening weekend, it finished number one at the box office with $16.4 million in 3,639 theaters.

Reception

Critical response
On Rotten Tomatoes, the film has an approval rating of 24% based on 124 reviews and an average rating of 4.26/10. The site's critical consensus reads, "An unoriginal and only occasionally funny family road-trip movie, RV is a mediocre effort that not even the charisma of Robin Williams can save." On Metacritic, it has a score of 33 out of 100 based on reviews from 28 critics, indicating "generally unfavorable reviews". Audiences polled by CinemaScore gave it an average grade of "B+" on an A+ to F scale.

Justin Chang of Variety said "RV works up an ingratiating sweetness that partially compensates for its blunt predictability and meager laughs." Roger Ebert, writing for the Chicago Sun-Times, gave the film two out of four stars, saying "There is nothing I much disliked but little to really recommend."

Accolades

See also
The Long Long Trailer

References

External links

 
 
 

2006 films
2000s adventure comedy films
2000s comedy road movies
American adventure comedy films
American comedy road movies
German adventure comedy films
German comedy road movies
English-language German films
Films about dysfunctional families
Films about vacationing
Films set in Colorado
Films shot in Alberta
Films shot in Vancouver
Columbia Pictures films
Films directed by Barry Sonnenfeld
Films produced by Lucy Fisher
Films produced by Douglas Wick
Films scored by James Newton Howard
2006 comedy films
Relativity Media films
Golden Raspberry Award winning films
2000s English-language films
2000s American films
2000s German films
English-language comedy films